Howick College is a state co-educational secondary school located in the eastern Auckland, New Zealand suburb of Cockle Bay. Serving Years 9 to 13, the school has a roll of  students as of

History
Howick College was established in 1974 to serve the Howick area of eastern Auckland. The school was built to the "S68" design, characterised by single-storey classroom blocks with reinforced masonry walls, low-pitched roofs, internal open courtyards and protruding clerestory windows.

The school abolished corporal punishment of students before it even opened, becoming one of the first schools in New Zealand to do so. Corporal punishment was abolished nationwide sixteen years later, in July 1990.

Enrolment
At the August 2012 Education Review Office (ERO) review of the school, Howick College had 1806 students enrolled, including 48 international students. The school roll's gender composition was 52% male and 48% female; and its ethnic composition was 47% New Zealand European (Pākehā), 14% Other European, 13% Māori, 8% Asian, 5% Pacific Islanders, 6% Indian, and 6% Other.

House system
Howick College has six school houses:

Principals
 Don Ingham 1974–1991
 Bill Dimery 1992–2009
 Iva Ropati 2010–2022
 Dale Burden 2023–

Notable alumni

Brent Cooper (born 1960), judoka who won a gold medal at the 1990 Commonwealth Games and placed fifth in the 1988 Olympic Games
Anthony Gelling (born 1990), Cook Islands Rugby league player who currently plays for Wigan Warriors in the Super League 
Selina Goddard (born 1994), lawn bowls player, Commonwealth Games bronze medallist (2014 Glasgow)
Christopher Luxon (born 1970), Member of Parliament for Botany, and former CEO of Air New Zealand
Tom McCartney (born 1985), rugby union player with the Blues
Mitchell McClenaghan (born 1986), cricketer with the Blackcaps
Jessica Mutch-Mckay, TVNZ political editor
Katrina Rore (née Grant; born 1987), netball player, captain of Central Pulse and a member of the Silver ferns
Dan Williamson (born 2000), Olympic gold medallist in rowing

Cultural references
In the bro'Town première episode "The Weakest Link" (2004), one of the schools competing in the high school quiz challenge is named "Howick Beijing College", a reference to the Howick area's large Chinese migrant population.

References

External links
School website
Education Review Office (ERO) reports for Howick College

Educational institutions established in 1974
Secondary schools in Auckland
New Zealand secondary schools of S68 plan construction
1974 establishments in New Zealand